The Kingfisher's Roost is a 1921 American silent western film directed by Louis Chaudet and Paul Hurst and starring Neal Hart, William Quinn and Ben Corbett. It was made and distributed by the independent Pinnacle Productions.

Cast
 Neal Hart as 	Barr Messenger
 Yvette Mitchell	as	Betty Brownlee
 William Quinn as 'Bull' Keeler
 Ben Corbett as 	'Red' McGee
 Chet Ryan as 	Sheriff Breen
 Jane Fosher as 	Mrs. Brownlee
 Floyd Anderson as 	Dan McFee
 W.S. Weatherwax as 	Bill Jackson
 John Judd as 	Chief of the Rurales
 Earl Simpson as Pete 
 Earl Dwire as 	Dave Butler

References

Bibliography
 Munden, Kenneth White. The American Film Institute Catalog of Motion Pictures Produced in the United States, Part 1. University of California Press, 1997.

External links
 

1920s American films
1921 films
1921 Western (genre) films
1920s English-language films
American silent feature films
Silent American Western (genre) films
American black-and-white films
Films directed by Louis Chaudet
Films directed by Paul Hurst